Yardy is a surname. Notable people with the surname include:

Michael Yardy (born 1980), English cricketer and coach
Valery Yardy (1948–1994), Russian cyclist

See also
Pardy
Vardy
Yary